Gracia Couturier (born August 14, 1951) is a Canadian educator and writer.

She was born in Edmundston, New Brunswick. She has lived in Moncton since the 1970s. Couturier received a BEd from the Université de Moncton. She taught school for several years and completed a master's degree in French literature in 1994.

She was a founding member of the Théâtre l'Escaouette in Moncton and was founding director of Théâtre de saisons du Centre universitaire de Shippagan. Her work includes children's literature, novels, plays and haiku. Couturier has also worked as a script writer and researcher for Radio-Canada.

Selected works

Children's literature 
 Un tintamarre dans ma tête (2002)
 Le vœu en vaut-il la chandelle? (2003)

Novels 
 L'antichambre (1997)
 Je regardais Rebecca (1999)
 Chacal, mon frère (2010), received the Prix des lecteurs Radio-Canada and the Prix France-Acadie

Plays 
 Les enfants, taisez-vous! (1983)
 Le gros ti-gars (1986)
 Mon mari est un ange (1988), also rewritten for television
 Les ans volés (1988)
 Enfantômes suroulettes (1989)

References 

1951 births
Living people
Canadian novelists in French
Canadian dramatists and playwrights in French
Acadian people
Canadian women novelists
Canadian children's writers in French
Canadian women children's writers
20th-century Canadian women writers
21st-century Canadian women writers
People from Edmundston
Writers from Moncton
Canadian women dramatists and playwrights
20th-century Canadian dramatists and playwrights